71st Division may refer to any of a number of  military divisions:

 Infantry Division 
 71st Division (1st Formation)(People's Republic of China), 1949–1950
 71st Division (2nd Formation)(People's Republic of China), 1969–1985
 71st Infantry Division (France)
 71st Infantry Division (Wehrmacht)
 71st Division (Philippines)
 71st Division (Imperial Japanese Army)
 71st Division (Spain)
 71st Infantry Division (United States)
 71st Division (United Kingdom)